Imbricaria pretiosa, common name the splendid mitre, is a species of sea snail, a marine gastropod mollusk in the family Mitridae, the miters or miter snails.

Description
The length of the shell varies between 15 mm and 40 mm.

Distribution
This marine species occurs in the Red Sea and off East Africa; in the Eastern Indian Ocean; and off Fiji.

References

 Kilburn R.N. (1974). Taxonomic notes on South African marine Mollusca (3): Gastropoda: Prosobranchia, with descriptions of new taxa of Naticidae, Fasciolariidae, Magilidae, Volutomitridae and Turridae. Annals of the Natal Museum. 22: 187-220.

Mitridae
Gastropods described in 1844